Rose Jelagat Cheruiyot (born 21 July 1976) is a runner from Kenya. She competed in the 5000 metres at the 1996 Summer Olympics and the 2000 Summer Olympics.

She is married to Ismael Kirui. The couple completed an unusual double, when they both won their senior races at the Belfast International Cross Country in 1995.

Cheruiyot broke the 5000 metres Kenyan record in 1996, timing 14:46.41. The record was beaten in September 2000 by Leah Malot, the new record was 14:39.83.

Achievements

Road running and marathons
2001 Zevenheuvelenloop - 1st
2002 Berlin Half Marathon - 1st
2005 Saint Silvester Road Race - 2nd
2005 Portugal Half Marathon - 1st
2006 Hamburg Marathon - 2nd
2006 Amsterdam Marathon - 1st
2007 Seoul International Marathon - 2nd
2007 Great South Run - 1st
2008 Dubai Marathon - 4th

Other achievements 
1994/95 IAAF World Cross Challenge - 2nd
1995/96 IAAF World Cross Challenge - 1st
2001 Cross Internacional de Soria winner

Personal best

Personal life
Cheruiyot's younger sister, Pasca Myers, a Seminole two-time runner up at the NCAA D-I Cross Country Championships, cites Rose's positive influence in her collegiate and post-collegiate running career.

References

External links

Marathoninfo

1976 births
Living people
Kenyan female long-distance runners
Kenyan female marathon runners
Athletes (track and field) at the 1994 Commonwealth Games
African Games gold medalists for Kenya
African Games medalists in athletics (track and field)
Kenyan female cross country runners
Athletes (track and field) at the 1996 Summer Olympics
Athletes (track and field) at the 2000 Summer Olympics
Olympic athletes of Kenya
Athletes (track and field) at the 1995 All-Africa Games
Commonwealth Games competitors for Kenya